Nkoranza District is a former district that was located in Brong-Ahafo Region (now currently in Bono East Region), Ghana. Originally created as an ordinary district assembly on 10 March 1989. However, on 1 November 2007 (effectively 29 February 2008), it was split off into two new districts: Nkoranza South District (which it was elevated to municipal district assembly status on 28 June 2012; capital: Nkoranza) and Nkoranza North District (capital: Busunya). The district assembly was located in the southern part of Brong-Ahafo Region (now southern part of Bono East Region) and had Nkoranza as its capital town.

Sources
 
 District: Nkoranza District
 19 New Districts Created, November 20, 2003.

References

Brong-Ahafo Region
Districts of Bono East Region